This is a list of the 630 members of the Italian Chamber of Deputies that were elected in the 2018 general election.

Five Star Movement

Lega – Salvini Premier

Democratic Party (Italy)

Forza Italia

Mixed Group

Independents

L'Alternativa c'è

Democratic Centre

Let's Make Eco–Federation of the Greens

Us with Italy–USEI–Renaissance–AdC

Linguistic Minorities (SVP–PATT)

Action–More Europe–Italian Radicals

MAIE–PSI

Brothers of Italy

Italia Viva

Courage Italy

Free and Equal

References